SBK Olimpia Grodno is a Belarusian women's basketball club from Grodno. It won the Belarusian Championship in 2007 and 2009, and in 2012 it made its debut in the FIBA Eurocup.

References

Women's basketball teams in Belarus
Sport in Grodno